Anthropology of media (also anthropology of mass media, media anthropology) is an area of study within social or cultural anthropology that emphasizes ethnographic studies as a means of understanding producers, audiences, and other cultural and social aspects of mass media.

Methodology
The use of qualitative methods, particularly ethnography, distinguishes media anthropology from other disciplinary approaches to mass media.  Within media studies, media ethnographies have been of increasing interest since the 1980s. However, as Stephen Putnam Hughes remarks in a recent review, these studies often do not engage in rigorous ethnographic fieldwork, ignoring or misapplying such landmark anthropological techniques as participant observation or long-term fieldwork. Given such differences, anthropologists who take an interest in the media see themselves as forming a distinct subfield from ethnographic approaches to media studies and cultural studies.

Theory
The anthropology of media is a fairly inter-disciplinary area, with a wide range of other influences. The theories used in the anthropology of media range from practice approaches, associated with theorists such as Pierre Bourdieu, as well as discussions of the appropriation and adaptation of new technologies and practices.  Theoretical approaches have also been adopted from visual anthropology and from film theory, as well as from studies of ritual and performance studies (e.g. dance and theatre), studies of consumption, audience reception in media studies, new media and network theories, theories of globalisation, theories of international civil society, and discussions on participatory communications and governance in development studies.

Ethnographic contexts
The types of ethnographic contexts explored in the anthropology of media range from contexts of media production (e.g., ethnographies of newsrooms in newspapers, journalists in the field, film production) to contexts of media reception, following audiences in their everyday responses to media such as newspaper cartoons (Khanduri 2014).  Other types include cyber anthropology, a relatively new area of internet research, as well as ethnographies of other areas of research which happen to involve media, such as development work, social movements, human rights  or health education. This is in addition to many classic ethnographic contexts, where media such as radio, the press, new media and television (Mankekar 1999, Abu-Lughod 2005) have started to make their presences felt since the early 1990s.

See also
 Mediatization (media)
 Social aspects of television
 Visual anthropology

Bibliography
Powdermaker, Hortense. (1950). Hollywood, the Dream Factory: An Anthropologist Looks at the Movie-Makers. Boston: Little, Brown
Spitulnik, Deborah. (1993). ‘Anthropology and Mass Media’, Annual Review of Anthropology, 22: 293-315
Banks, Marcus & Howard Morphy. (1997). Rethinking Visual Anthropology. New Haven: Yale University Press
Dickey, Sara. (1997). ‘Anthropology and Its Contributions to the Study of Mass Media’, International Social Science Journal, 153 : 413-427
Mankekar, Purnima. (1999). Screening Culture, Viewing Politics: An Ethnography of Television, Womanhood, and Nation in Postcolonial India. Durham: Duke University Press.
Askew, Kelly & Richard R. Wilk. (2002). The Anthropology of Media: A Reader. Malden: Blackwell Publishers
Ginsburg, Faye, Abu-Lughod, Lila & Brian Larkin (eds.). (2002). Media Worlds: Anthropology on New Terrain. Berkeley: University of California Press
Peterson, Mark Allen. (2003). Anthropology and Mass Communication: Media and Myth in the New Millennium. New York: Berghahn Books
Born, Georgina. (2004). Uncertain Vision: Birt, Dyke, and the Reinvention of the BBC. London: Secker & Warburg
Rothenbuhler, Eric & Mihai Coman. (2005). Media Anthropology. Thousand Oaks: SAGE Publications
Larkin, Brian. (2008). Signal and Noise: Media, Infrastructure and Urban Culture in Nigeria. Durham: Duke University Press
Ganti, Tejaswini. (2012). Producing Bollywood: Inside the Contemporary Hindi Film Industry. Durham & London: Duke University Press
Wortham, Erica. (2013)."Indigenous Media in Mexico: Culture, Community and the State". Duke University Press
Khanduri, Ritu (2014). Caricaturing Culture in India: Cartoons and History of the Modern World. Cambridge: Cambridge University Press.
Martin, Sylvia J. (2017). Haunted: An Ethnography of the Hollywood and Hong Kong Media Industries. New York: Oxford University Press.

References

External links
European Association of Social Anthropologists (EASA) Media Anthropology Network

Masters in Visual, Material and Museum Ethnography, University of Oxford
Masters in the Anthropology of Media, SOAS
Graduate Certificate Program in Culture and Media, New York University
Masters in Visual Anthropology, University of Southern California

Cultural anthropology
Visual anthropology
Anthropology